The Lister-Jaguar Coupe is a unique sports car grand tourer, commissioned by Brian Lister, and designed by Frank Costin of Lister, in 1963. Only one car was ever built.

References

Lister-Jaguar Coupe
Cars of England
Jaguar vehicles
Rear-wheel-drive vehicles
Cars introduced in 1963
Grand tourers